This is a list of Texas A&M Aggies football players in the NFL draft.

Key

Selections

References

Texas AandM Aggies

Texas A&M Aggies NFL draft